was a Japanese writer.

The former television script writer and essayist won the 99th Naoki Prize in 1988 for his novel Coo: Tooi Umi Kara Kita Coo. The novel was later adapted into an animated film. Kageyama also contributed to the films Sakana kara daiokishin!! (1992), Saraba itoshiki hito yo (1987), and Hoshikuzu kodai no densetsu (1985), and appeared as a judge on the TV series Iron Chef. 

Tamio died at the age of 50 in a house fire at his residence.

References

External links
 

1947 births
1998 deaths
20th-century Japanese novelists
Deaths from fire in Japan